Vromonas is a Greek island in the Ionian Islands located east of the island of Ithaca. , it had no resident population.

References

External links
Vromonas on GTP Travel Pages (in English and Greek)

Echinades
Islands of the Ionian Islands (region)
Landforms of Ithaca
Islands of Greece